The Audit Board of Indonesia is a high state body in Indonesia which is responsible for evaluation of management and accountability of state finances conducted by the central government, local governments, Bank Indonesia, state-owned enterprises, the Public Service Board, and institutions or other entities which manage state finances.

History
The body was initially established under the name National Supervision Board at Magelang, Central Java during the United States of Indonesia period on 28 December 1946. The Board currently functions under the latest revision to the laws governing it dating to 2006. The Board has increasingly tackled environmental issues, revealing in 2014 that the Ciliwung River had been polluted by seventeen separate companies, submitting its report to the police.

As of 2015, the Audit Board of Indonesia was chairing the International Organization of Supreme Audit Institutions' Working Group on Environmental Auditing.

In 2016, Board chairman Harry Azhar Azis was implicated in the Panama Papers due to a previously registered blank company which he hadn't reported. Azis claimed that the company was merely a registered name on paper which he had started for his oldest daughter, but then sold to someone else after his appointment as Board chairman in December 2014.

Chair of the Audit Board

The following people have held the position of Chair of the Audit Board since 1947.

Powers
The Board is the highest body within the Indonesian government in terms of state financial accountability and management. Their work ranges from the national to local levels, and they have offices in every province in Indonesia.

See also
 Court of Audit
 Algemene Rekenkamer

References

External links
 Official Website

Government audit
Supreme audit institutions